John Smith (July 16, 1781 – May 23, 1854), known as Uncle John, was an early leader of the Church of Jesus Christ of Latter-day Saints (LDS Church).

Smith was the younger brother of Joseph Smith Sr., uncle of Joseph Smith and Hyrum Smith, father of George A. Smith, grandfather of John Henry Smith, and great-grandfather of George Albert Smith. He served as a member of the first presiding high council in Kirtland, Ohio, as an assistant counselor in the First Presidency under Joseph Smith, and as presiding patriarch under Brigham Young. He was succeeded as presiding patriarch by his great nephew, who was also named John Smith.

Smith served as president of the stake in Lee County, Iowa, during the Nauvoo period. He was also the first president of the Salt Lake Stake, the first stake in Utah Territory, and as such was the leader of the Latter-day Saints in Utah in the winter of 1847–48.

Smith practiced plural marriage and fathered four children.

Smith died at Salt Lake City and was buried at Salt Lake City Cemetery.

Notes

Further reading 
 

1781 births
1854 deaths
American general authorities (LDS Church)
Burials at Salt Lake City Cemetery
Converts to Mormonism
Counselors in the First Presidency (LDS Church)
Doctrine and Covenants people
Latter Day Saints from New York (state)
Latter Day Saints from Utah
Leaders in the Church of Christ (Latter Day Saints)
Mormon pioneers
Presiding Patriarchs (LDS Church)
Religious leaders from New Hampshire
Smith family (Latter Day Saints)